Energizer Holdings, Inc. is an American manufacturer and one of the world's largest manufacturers of batteries, headquartered in St. Louis, Missouri. It produces batteries under the Energizer, Ray-O-Vac, Varta, and Eveready brand names, and formerly owned a number of personal care businesses until it separated that side of the business into a new company called Edgewell Personal Care in 2015.

In January 2018, Energizer announced it was purchasing the global battery and lighting division from Spectrum Brands, which includes the Ray-O-Vac and Varta brands, for $2 billion in cash. This acquisition was finalized in January 2019 after a lengthy regulatory approval process. In November 2018, Energizer also purchased the global auto care division from Spectrum (brands which include Armor All, STP, and A/C Pro) for $1.25 billion in cash and stock.

History 

The company has its foundation in the Eveready Battery Company, which in 1980 changed the name of its Eveready Alkaline Power Cell to Energizer.  In 1986, corporate parent Union Carbide sold Eveready Battery to Ralston Purina. In 2000, Ralston spun off Eveready, and the company was listed on the New York Stock Exchange as Energizer Holdings, Inc.

In 2003 under the leadership of then Chief Executive Officer J. Patrick Mulcahy, Energizer Holdings started expanding into the personal care product sector by buying personal care and razor brand Schick and razor brand Wilkinson Sword from Pfizer.

In 2005, after Hurricane Katrina, Energizer worked with the Red Cross to donate flashlights, batteries, razors and funds to help Hurricane Katrina relief workers and victims. On November 3, 2005, Energizer Holdings Inc. said that higher sales of its Schick razors and blades partially offset lower sales of its batteries in North America. On a constant-currency basis, sales at Energizer rose 4 percent in its fourth quarter.

In October 2007, the company acquired Playtex Products, Inc. for $1.9 billion. The purchase included sunscreen brand Hawaiian Tropic, which Playtex had bought a few months earlier, and Sun Pharmaceuticals Corp., which manufactures the Banana Boat sunscreen products.

In 2009, Energizer acquired Edge and Skintimate shaving gels from S.C. Johnson & Son.

In 2010, the company released a new "Energizer Advanced Lithium" line as their top-performing product series.

In October 2010, Energizer announced it was the winning bidder for privately held American Safety Razor in a bankruptcy court auction.

On October 19, 2012 Energizer Holdings said it was withdrawing 23 varieties of its Banana Boat brand of UltraMist spray-on sunscreen lotion from stores due to the risk of it igniting when exposed to fire.

On July 31, 2013, Energizer bought the Stayfree, Carefree and o.b. brands from Johnson & Johnson for $185 million. The purchase was only for the brands in North America – Johnson & Johnson continues to own the brands in all other regions of the world.

On April 30, 2014, Energizer announced that by September 2015 it would separate its two lines of business into two publicly traded companies. The household business, with revenue of $1.9 billion in the latest fiscal year, would have Energizer chairman J. Patrick Mulcahy as its chairman and unit chief Alan Hoskins as CEO, and would sell batteries, flashlights and lamps. The personal care company, whose revenue was $2.6 billion, would have Energizer CEO Ward Klein serving as chairman and current unit head David Hatfield as CEO, and would sell feminine products from Playtex, Carefree, o.b. and Stayfree; shaving products from Schick, Edge, Skintimate and Wilkinson Sword; and suntan products from Hawaiian Tropic and Banana Boat.

In 2016, Energizer acquired HandStands Holding Corporation, a leading designer and marketer of automotive fragrance and appearance products. In 2018, Energizer further expanded its auto care portfolio with the Nu Finish auto appearance brands.

In January 2018, Energizer announced it was purchasing the global battery and lighting division from Spectrum Brands, which includes the Ray-O-Vac and Varta consumer batteries brands, for $2 billion in cash. This acquisition was finalized in January 2019. However, in May of the same year, the EU antitrust authorities ordered the household battery production of the Varta brand to be let go. This was quickly bought by Varta to reunite the brand, though Energizer still holds the VARTA brand for the Latin America and Asia Pacific markets.

Operations
, Energizer has six operational facilities in the United States. It also has a manufacturing facility in Singapore since 1946, supplying the Asia and Oceania markets.
Singapore is home to Energizer's largest international plant, which is also the only Energizer facility outside the United States capable of producing alkaline and lithium batteries.

See also 
Energizer Bunny

References

External links 

 
 Corporate website
 Rayovac website
 Rayovac Latam website
 Rayovac Europe website

Ralston Purina
Energizer Holdings
Consumer battery manufacturers
Manufacturing companies based in Missouri
Companies based in St. Louis County, Missouri
Companies of Singapore
American companies established in 1896
Electronics companies established in 1896
Companies listed on the New York Stock Exchange
Former components of the Dow Jones Industrial Average
2000 initial public offerings
American brands